Miguel Fernando Pereira Rodrigues (born 16 March 1993) is a Portuguese footballer who plays as a central defender for F.C. Oliveira do Hospital.

Club career
Born in Fátima, Santarém District, Rodrigues finished his development at U.D. Leiria. On 5 May 2012, with the club immerse in a deep financial crisis, he made his Primeira Liga debut in a 1–0 away loss against S.L. Benfica.

In July 2012, Rodrigues signed with fellow league team C.D. Nacional. He played 17 matches in his first season, helping to an eighth-place finish.

Rodrigues scored his first league goal for the Madeirans – and in the top division – on 19 April 2014, as the visitors routed F.C. Paços de Ferreira 5–0 and qualified for the UEFA Europa League. His maiden appearance in the continental competition took place on 21 August of the same year, when he featured the entire 2–0 away defeat to FC Dinamo Minsk in the play-off round.

From 2016 to 2018, Rodrigues competed in the Super League Greece with Panetolikos FC. On 19 May 2018, he returned to his homeland and joined Rio Ave F.C. on a free transfer.

Rodrigues was loaned to G.D. Estoril Praia of the LigaPro in the 2019 January transfer window, for five months. Rought one year later, he terminated his contract with Rio Ave.

International career
Rodrigues won his only cap for Portugal at under-21 level on 4 September 2014, starting and finishing a 2–1 away victory over Norway in the 2015 UEFA European Championship qualifiers.

References

External links

1993 births
Living people
Sportspeople from Santarém District
Portuguese footballers
Association football defenders
Primeira Liga players
Liga Portugal 2 players
Campeonato de Portugal (league) players
C.D. Fátima players
U.D. Leiria players
C.D. Nacional players
Rio Ave F.C. players
G.D. Estoril Praia players
F.C. Oliveira do Hospital players
Super League Greece players
Panetolikos F.C. players
Portugal youth international footballers
Portugal under-21 international footballers
Portuguese expatriate footballers
Expatriate footballers in Greece
Portuguese expatriate sportspeople in Greece